Azadegan is a water park located in southeastern Tehran, Iran. A major tourist attraction, it contains an artificial lake and wave machine. To the south of the water park are extensive gardens known as the Azadegan Gardens.

See also
Pars Aqua Village

References

Water parks in Iran
Parks in Tehran